Arthur Gordon Grant (January 20, 1919 – June 12, 1943) was a Canadian professional ice hockey player who played as a goaltender in the Scottish National League for the Ayr Raiders. He also appeared non-professionally for the Winnipeg Monarchs.

Early life and hockey career
Grant was born on January 20, 1919, in Montreal to Keith Gordon and Marjory Grant. He joined the Winnipeg Falcon-Rangers of the Manitoba Junior Hockey League in 1937, and played one season there before transferring to the Winnipeg Monarchs. Emigrating to Scotland in 1939, he played for the Ayr Raiders and Fife Flyers before joining the armed forces. He married in September 1942.

Military career and death
Grant served in the Royal Winnipeg Rifles for 6 months as a private. In civilian life, he worked as a clockkeeper during his time in Scotland. Moving back to Canada in July 1940, Grant enlisted in the Royal Canadian Air Force in Winnipeg on February 26, 1941, and was assigned to pilot training, completing the course in January 1943 and being transferred to England thereafter.

On June 12, 1943, Pilot Officer Grant took off from RAF Leeming in Handley Page Halifax JB972 to conduct a raid on Düsseldorf. Southwest of Rheinberg, Nazi Germany, the aircraft was shot down, killing 3 of the crew members aboard, including Grant. The remaining 4 crew members became prisoners of war, and Grant and the other 2 crew members killed were listed as presumed dead in October 1943. The 3 dead crew had been buried at Monchengladbach after the crash, but were disinterred in 1949 and reburied at Rheinberg War Cemetery.

Career statistics

References

1919 births
1940s missing person cases
1943 deaths
Canadian ice hockey goaltenders
Canadian expatriate ice hockey players in Scotland
Winnipeg Monarchs players
Fife Flyers players
Royal Canadian Air Force personnel of World War II
Royal Canadian Air Force officers
Canadian World War II pilots
Canadian military personnel killed in World War II
Aviators killed by being shot down
Burials at Rheinberg War Cemetery
Missing in action of World War II
Missing person cases in Germany
Ice hockey people from Montreal
Military personnel from Montreal
Canadian Army personnel of World War II
Royal Winnipeg Rifles soldiers